Thomas Vernon may refer to:

 Thomas Vernon (died 1556), MP for Shropshire
 Thomas Vernon (lawyer) (1654–1721), Chancery lawyer and MP for Worcestershire
 Thomas Vernon (MP for Worcester) (1724–1771), landowner and MP for Worcester
 Thomas Vernon (engraver) (c. 1824–1872), engraver
 Thomas Shrawley Vernon (1759–1825), High Sheriff of Worcestershire 1825
 Tom Vernon (1939–2013), British broadcaster and writer
 Roy Vernon (Thomas Royston Vernon, 1937–1993), Welsh footballer

See also

 Vernon Thomas (born 1935), Anglo Indian author
 Vernon Thomas (wrestler) (1914–1957), New Zealand wrestler